A rehearsal is a preparatory event in music and theatre (and in other contexts) that is performed before the official public performance.

Rehearsal may also refer to:

 Rehearsal (album), 2021 album by Skegss
 Rehearsal (educational psychology), the cognitive process of repeating information over and over to aid learning
 Rehearsal (EP), a 2005 EP by A Perfect Murder
 Rehearsal (film), a 2015 film directed by Carl Bessai
 "Rehearsal" (Space Ghost Coast to Coast), a television episode

See also
 Memory rehearsal, a term for the role of repetition in the retention of memories
 The Rehearsal (disambiguation)
 Dress rehearsal (disambiguation)